is a Japanese light novel, manga, and anime artist. Their most famous work is Baka and Test, which inspired a two series anime and a video game for the PlayStation Portable. They are also responsible for Astarotte no Omocha! and Sakura*Nadeshiko. Additionally, they were  responsible for the ending illustrations in Nisemonogatari.

References 

Manga artists
Anime character designers
Living people
Year of birth missing (living people)